Zhu Renxue (born April 6, 1991 in Huize, Yunnan) is a Chinese male marathoner. He took the 3rd place at the Chongqing International Marathon and the Olympic trials on March 21, 2016, Zhu was eligible for Rio 2016 Olympic marathon entries.

References

1991 births
Living people
Chinese male marathon runners
People from Qujing
Runners from Yunnan
Olympic athletes of China
Athletes (track and field) at the 2016 Summer Olympics
Athletes (track and field) at the 2018 Asian Games
Asian Games competitors for China